Farlow is a civil parish in Shropshire, England.  The parish contains five listed buildings that are recorded in the National Heritage List for England.  All the listed buildings are designated at Grade II, the lowest of the three grades, which is applied to "buildings of national importance and special interest".  The parish contains the village of Farlow, and is otherwise rural.  The listed buildings consist of a barn, a house, a former Methodist chapel, a church, and a war memorial in the form of a lych gate.


Buildings

References

Citations

Sources

Lists of buildings and structures in Shropshire